Germano Rocha is a fado singer and restaurant owner.

Germano Rocha was born to in Portugal; he moved to Canada in the 1970s.

Music career

Discography
 Germano Rocha Chante Le Fado de Coimbra -Fado Triste/ Fado Hilario/ Rua De Capelao/ Coimbra Menina E Moca. EP 1960s Polydor France 27 273

References

External links
 

Living people
Portuguese fado singers
Year of birth missing (living people)